Siegfried Thiele (born 28 March 1934) is a German composer. From 1990 to 1997 he was rector of the University of Music and Theatre Leipzig.

Life 
Born in Chemnitz Thiele was born the son of a craftsman. Already at the age of twelve he created his first compositions. He had music lessons with Werner Hübschmann and Gustav William Meyer and took part in the studio choir of the Volksbühne Chemnitz, directed by Paul Kurzbach.

After his Abitur in 1952 at the  Thiele studied musical composition with Wilhelm Weismann and Johannes Weyrauch from 1953 to 1958, conducting with Franz Jung and Heinz Rögner and piano with Rudolf Fischer and Amadeus Webersinke at the University of Music and Theatre Leipzig. From 1958 to 1962 he was teacher as well as choir and orchestra conductor at the music schools in Radeberg and Wurzen. From 1959 he performed his chamber music, symphonic and choral symphonic works at home and abroad. Since that time he has also been active in the Leipzig congregation of The Christian Community as a musician and composer for liturgical and other works.

From 1960 to 1962 Thiele studied composition with Leo Spies at the Academy of Arts, Berlin. In 1962 he began teaching composition and score playing at the Leipzig Academy of Music and in 1963 founded the Leipzig Youth Symphony Orchestra, which he directed until 1978. From 1971 to 1999 he was a lecturer (from 1984 professor) for composition at the Leipzig Academy of Music. Among his students were Bernd Franke, Walter Thomas Heyn, Thomas Reuter, Reinhard Pfundt and Steffen Schleiermacher.

On the occasion of the opening of the Neues Gewandhaus zu Leipzig on 8 October 1981, Thiele created the great commissioned work Gesänge an die Sonne for alto and tenor solo, organ, choir and orchestra. It was premiered in the opening concert under the direction of the then Gewandhaus Kapellmeister Kurt Masur, who wanted the new large organ of the Gewandhaus to be appropriately included in this composition. Thiele took the texts from the Prolog im Himmel from Goethe's Faust, Schiller's poem An die Sonne and Hölderlin's Dem Sonnengott. Only after Masur's intervention was this play allowed to be performed at all at the opening, since the Zentralkomitee der SED did not like the texts.

On 1 October 1990 Thiele took office as the newly elected Rector of the Academy of Music and Theatre in Leipzig. In 1994 he was re-elected in this function for another three years.

In 1999 he was guest of honour at the Villa Massimo in Rome. In 2001 he was appointed Honorary Senator of the Academy of Music and Theatre Leipzig.

Awards 
 1965: Mendelssohn Scholarship
 1966:  für Musik
 1979: Kunstpreis der Stadt Leipzig
 1983: Art Prize of the German Democratic Republic
 2002: Order of Merit of the Free State of Saxony of the Freistaates Sachsen

Literature 
 Thiele, Prof. Siegfried. In Wilfried W. Bruchhäuser: Komponisten der Gegenwart in the Deutschen Komponisten-Interessenverband. Ein Handbuch. 4th edition . Deutscher Komponisten-Interessenverband, Berlin 1995, .
 Prof. Siegfried Thiele zum 70. Geburtstag. In Journal Zeitschrift der Hochschule für Musik und Theater Leipzig, Supplement to no. 17, summer semester 2004, in which among others:
 : Botschaft der Töne. Botschaft der Worte. Der Komponist Siegfried Thiele.
 Gesine Schröder: Machaut für die Jugend. Anmerkungen zu Siegfried Thieles pädagogischer Orchestermusik.. Extended version: Saxon State Library - State and University Library, Dresden 2014.
 Thiele, Siegfried. In Brockhaus Riemann Musiklexikon. CD-Rom, Directmedia Publishing, Berlin 2004, .
 Christiane Niklew, : Thiele, Siegfried In  5th edition. Vol. 2, Ch. Links, Berlin 2010,

References

External links 
 
 Siegfried Thiele bei Edition Peters (Musikverlag)
 

20th-century classical composers
20th-century German composers
1934 births
Living people
People from Chemnitz
Recipients of the Order of Merit of the Free State of Saxony